Mac & Cheese 3 is the sixteenth mixtape by American rapper French Montana, and the third installation in his "Mac & Cheese" series of mixtapes. It was released on November 19, 2012.
The mixtape features guest appearances from Diddy, Red Cafe, MGK, Los, Future, Chinx Drugz, Ma$e, Rico Love, Fat Joe, Wale, Mac Miller, Curren$y, J. Cole, Rick Ross, Trina, Prodigy, Fabolous, Tyga and Ace Hood.

Background 

In 2012, French Montana signed a deal with Diddy's Bad Boy Entertainment, and another deal with Rick Ross's Maybach Music Group. Montana announced his project, under the title Mac & Cheese 3, will be his first release on the label. The mixtape has a selection of songs, which were meant for his debut album, titled Excuse My French. However, he decided to release this project, consisting twenty tracks for free download. After a small delay, French Montana has released the third installment of the Mac & Cheese mixtape series on November 18, 2012. He also released the mixtape in a clean version, in order to get radio airplay.

Montana listed the guest appearances of Bad Boy affiliates Diddy, Red Cafe, MGK, Los, and MMG affiliates Rick Ross, Wale, alongside the likes of Chinx Drugz, Ma$e, Rico Love, Fat Joe, Future, Mac Miller, Curren$y, J. Cole, Trina, Prodigy, Fabolous, Tyga and Ace Hood. Production was handled by Young Chop, Harry Fraud, Boi-1da, DJ Mustard and Black Metaphor, among others. The mixtape was downloaded over 437,000 times in under 2 weeks on the DatPiff server. The mixtape was downloaded over a million times on DatPiff, that made the mixtape go "diamond".

Track listing

 Release history 

 References 

 External links Music videos'
 Only If For A Night
 Ocho Cinco
 Devil Want My Soul
 State Of Mind
 Diamonds
 Tic Toc
 Sanctuary
 Thrilla In Manilla

2012 mixtape albums
French Montana albums
Albums produced by Young Chop
Albums produced by Harry Fraud
Albums produced by Boi-1da
Albums produced by Rico Love
Bad Boy Records albums
Sequel albums
Albums produced by DJ Mustard
Albums produced by Vinylz